The 29th KBS Cup began on 12 March 2010 and concluded on 21 March 2011. Park Junghwan defeated Paek Hongsuk 2–0 in the final.

Tournament

Note: the top 32 players are the winners section, while the bottom is the losers section.

References

2011 in go
Go competitions in South Korea